ALVAC-CEA vaccine is a cancer vaccine containing a canary pox virus (ALVAC) combined with the carcinoembryonic antigen (CEA) human gene.

A phase I trial in 118 patients showed safety in humans.

References

External links 
 ALVAC-CEA vaccine entry in the public domain NCI Dictionary of Cancer Terms

Cancer vaccines